Byron Tau is an American journalist at The Wall Street Journal. He covers the Department of Justice and was previously a White House reporter.  On July 30, 2021, Tau announced he is writing a book on the use of commercial data in U.S. government surveillance programs for Crown Publishing Group.

Early life and education 
Tau graduated with a B.A. in political science and North American history from McGill University in 2008. He then completed an MA in journalism at Georgetown University in 2011.

Career 
Tau began his journalism career at Politico as a news assistant to Ben Smith, helping him run his politics blog, before being made a fully-fledged reporter in 2011. His remit included covering national politics, including the 2012 presidential campaign, and the White House.

He left Politico in 2014 to join The Wall Street Journal as a White House reporter in time for the 2016 presidential election. After the election, Tau began writing about national security issues as Capitol Hill Correspondent for The Journal. He regularly appears on radio and television networks, including WNYC and C-SPAN.

Tau is considered among the lead writers at The Journal covering the investigation into Russian interference in the 2016 election and obstruction of justice by special counsel Robert S. Mueller III.

References

External links 
Byron Tau on Twitter

American male journalists
Georgetown University Graduate School of Arts and Sciences alumni
McGill University alumni
The Wall Street Journal people
Politico people
Living people
Year of birth missing (living people)